The 2022–2023 Russian mystery fires are a series of unusual fires and explosions that have occurred since the invasion of Ukraine, which have not been formally explained. There have been many notable arson attacks on military recruitment offices in Russia since the beginning of the war, and there has been speculation that some of the fires or explosions have been the result of sabotage efforts by Ukraine.

Overview 
A "yellow" (medium) terrorist threat level was introduced in Bryansk, Kursk, and Belgorod oblasts, as well as some districts of Voronezh Oblast, Krasnodar Krai, and northern Crimea. Starting from the end of March, a series of incidents and explosions were reported in border regions of Bryansk, Kursk, Belgorod, and Voronezh Oblasts. Russian officials reported mortar shelling, drone attacks, and helicopter gunship attacks allegedly coming "from the Ukrainian side".

The Ukrainian side refused to confirm or deny involvement in incidents at strategic locations. There were allegations that some of the fires or explosions were the result of Ukrainian sabotage.

In May, a series of incidents on railway lines in Russia impeded the deployment of troops and military equipment to Ukraine; responsibility for these incidents was claimed by the Internet movement "Stop the Wagons" (a reference to the Russian anti-war slogan "Stop the War").

List of reported fires

See also 
2022 Siberian wildfires
2022–23 Western Russia attacks
Crimean Bridge explosion
Freedom of Russia Legion
Russian military commissariats attacks
Suspicious deaths of Russian businesspeople (2022–2023)

Notes 
Original Russian terms

References 

2022 fires in Asia
2022 fires in Europe
2022 in Russia
Fires in Russia
Explosions in Russia
2022 disasters in Russia
2023 disasters in Russia
Resistance during the 2022 Russian invasion of Ukraine